Sergei Nikolaevich Martynov (born 22 February 1953)  is a Belarusian politician who was Minister for Foreign Affairs of Belarus from 2003 to 2012.

Sergei Martynov was born in 1953 in Leninakan (now Gyumri), Armenian SSR. He graduated from the Moscow State Institute of International Relations, summa cum laude, in 1975.

He previously served in diplomatic representation of Belarus in the United States and as the ambassador in Washington, D.C. between 1993 and 1997. Before his appointment as foreign minister, he also served as ambassador to Belgium, the EU and to NATO between 2001 and 2003. Sergei Martynov was appointed to the post of Foreign Minister of Belarus in March 2003 and dismissed in August 2012.

He is fluent in Russian, English, French and Swahili.

References

External links

Official biography
Presentation to United Nations by Sergei Martynov

1953 births
Living people
People from Gyumri
Foreign ministers of Belarus
Moscow State Institute of International Relations alumni
Belarusian diplomats
Members of the Committee on Economic, Social and Cultural Rights
Ambassadors of Belarus to the United States
Ambassadors of Belarus to Belgium
Ambassadors of Belarus to the European Union